Parasanaa is a genus of bush-cricket recorded from India, Indochina, Malesia through to New Guinea. It is represented by a single species, Parasanaa donovani

This insect has also been called Typhoptera donovani, Gryllus donovani and Capnoptera donovani. The species was described by Edward Donovan in 1834.

Description
The adult is black with lemon-yellow patches on the thorax and tegmina.

Habits
It is found throughout August on the cactus on which it feeds. It is heavy and sluggish, generally still by day, nestled among the cactus thorns, with the front legs and the long antennae stretched forward onto the plant's surface, parallel to each other.
To escape predators it would rather drop from the cactus than take flight. It is more active at night, when it feeds and moves about.

When the thorax is pinched, the insect squirts a slimy yellow fluid from two slits on the dorsal surface of the mesothorax, with a range of three to four inches. One aperture may discharge at first, and the other after the insect is pinched again. Some fluid also oozes out from other apertures over the body and legs, and also from the stumps of broken-off legs.

See also
 Sanaa, a related genus similar in appearance and geographical distribution
 Poecilocerus pictus, another squirting grasshopper
 Aularches miliaris, a foam-squirting grasshopper from Myanmar
 Tegra novaehollandiae, a liquid-oozing grasshopper
 Bombardier beetle, which squirts a boiling mixture

References

External links
Westwood (1848) colour drawing. Via the OSF; Accessed on 2013-01-29.
Hingston (1927) schematic drawing showing fluid exudation openings. Via the OSF; Accessed on 2013-01-29.

Pseudophyllinae
Tettigoniidae genera
Monotypic Orthoptera genera
Orthoptera of Asia
Insects described in 1934